The Bagh-e Bala Palace is a former royal palace in Kabul, Afghanistan. It is located at a hilltop in the Bagh-e Bala (High Garden) park near Karte Parwan. The palace has a large pool (added in the 1970s) and is surrounded by pine trees.

History
It was built by Emir Abdur Rahman Khan in 1893 as a place for him to spend summers in, and he later died there in 1901. It was then used as a castle under Emir Habibullah Khan, and then as a guesthouse. 

In 1919 it housed the National Museum of Afghanistan before the collection was moved elsewhere, and the palace became a military house under King Ghazi Amanullah Khan. After being abandoned by 1930, it was renovated and turned into a restaurant under King Zahir Shah in the 1960s. 

The palace survived the civil war of the 1990s. It was renovated again in the 2000s and 2010s, with its interior preserved to look like the original 19th century design, but it is currently not in official use. 

The area around the palace (Bagh-e Bala) has become a large public park. American historians Nancy and Louis Dupree married here in 1966.

Gallery

See also
Darul Aman Palace
Tajbeg Palace
Chihilsitoon Palace
Bala Hissar

References

Palaces in Afghanistan
Buildings and structures in Kabul Province
Royal residences in Afghanistan
1893 establishments in Afghanistan